West Keansburg is an unincorporated community located within Hazlet Township in Monmouth County, New Jersey, United States. As of the 2000 United States Census, West Keansburg had a population of 14,423, which is over half of Hazlet's total population of 21,165.

Notable landmarks or businesses in the area include Helfrich Bus Company, West Keansburg Fire Company Number One, Jacques Caterers, and Eight Street Park.

West Keansburg residents have a different ZIP code than that of other residents of Hazlet. West Keansburg is served by the 07734 ZIP code, with the remainder of the township served by the 07730 Hazlet post office. In early October 2013, The United States Postal Service officially changed the name of the West Keansburg post office to "Hazlet".

References

External links
City data

Hazlet, New Jersey
Unincorporated communities in Monmouth County, New Jersey
Unincorporated communities in New Jersey